The R301 is a regional route in the Western Cape province of South Africa. It begins at an intersection with the R45 at Wemmershoek and runs north to cross the N1 at exit 59. It passes through Paarl and Wellington and then north-east over Bain's Kloof Pass to an intersection with the R43 near Wolseley.

References

External links
 

301